The Downshire Lawn Tennis Tournament was late Victorian era men's and women's grass court tennis event established in 1881 that ran until at least 1896. The tournament was organised by the Downshire Archery and Lawn Tennis Club, and usually held Cliftonville Cricket Club Ground, Belfast, Northern Ireland.

History
The Downshire Lawn Tennis Tournament was a men's and women's grass court tennis event established in 1881, that ran until at least 1896. The tournament was organised by the Downshire Archery and Lawn Tennis Club, and usually held at the Cliftonville Cricket Club Ground, Belfast, Northern Ireland.

See also
 Cliftonville Cricket Club

References

Defunct tennis tournaments in the United Kingdom
Grass court tennis tournaments
Tennis tournaments in Ireland